The Hira Mahal is a pavilion in the Delhi Red Fort located on the eastern wall north of the Moti Masjid.

Architecture
This four-sided pavilion of white marble was built in 1842, during the reign of Bahadur Shah II. It stands at the end of a southern axis of the Hayat Baksh Bagh, overlooking it. It is simply decorated, with reliefs but no inlay work. The arches are carved and the pavilion is overhung with chhajja, overhanging eave. 

Located to the north end was the Moti Mahal, which was an identical structure built at the same time for the northern axis. It was probably destroyed during or after the Indian Rebellion of 1857. In between these two pavilions was a pool or another structure.

References

External links 

Red Fort
Pavilions